Fulham was a constituency used for elections to the London County Council between 1889 and 1919, and again between 1955 and the council's abolition, in 1965.  The seat shared boundaries with the UK Parliament constituency of the same name.  The seat largely replaced Fulham East and Fulham West.

Councillors

Election results

1889 to 1919

1955 to 1964

References

London County Council constituencies
Politics of the London Borough of Hammersmith and Fulham
Fulham